Shalom International School is a private preschool, elementary and high school in Port Harcourt, Rivers State, Nigeria. It is located along agip road, before agip by Adagoerge, Rumueme and was founded by Chidi Amadi and his wife Vidal.

History
In the beginning, the school had 18 registered pupils, 4 teachers and 4 functional classrooms. Today, the enrollment is 540 with over 30 functional classrooms and a total staff strength of 72.

Shalom was formally registered as a private educational institution in 2000. The school has received approval and permit from the Rivers State Ministry of Education.

Facilities
Shalom International School has two campuses: Port Harcourt and Igwuruta. The facilities that can be found within Shalom's main campus include:
 Science laboratory
 Fine arts studio
 ICT centre
 Music studio 
 Home Economics laboratory
 An expanded library
 A Skill Acquisition Centre with respective studios for Hairstyling/Cosmetology, Fashion Design, Beadworks/Fashion Accessories, Baking & Fingerfoods, Leather Works and Graphic Design/Coding.

References

External links

Private schools in Port Harcourt
Primary schools in Rivers State
Obio-Akpor
Secondary schools in Rivers State